Meinrad II Charles Anthony of Hohenzollern-Sigmaringen (1 November 1673 in Sigmaringen – 20 October 1715 in Sigmaringen) was Prince of Hohenzollern-Sigmaringen from 1689 until his death.

Life 
Meinrad was a son of Prince Maximilian I of Hohenzollern-Sigmaringen (1636–1689) from his marriage to Maria Clara (1635–1715), the daughter of Count Albert of Berg-s'-Heerenberg.  He was still a minor when he succeeded his father in 1689 and initially, he stood under the guardianship of his mother and his uncle Franz Anton, Count of Hohenzollern-Haigerloch.

He studied at the University of Ingolstadt and embarked on a military career. He fought in the Battle of Vienna, the Hungarian rebellion and the Nine Years' War.  In 1692, Emperor Leopold I raised the Swabian branch of the House of Hohenzollern to Imperial Princes, under the condition that they would practice primogeniture in the future, i.e. they were not allowed to increase the number of imperial princes by further subdividing their principalities.  In 1695, Meinrad II concluded a treaty of inheritance with the Elector of Brandenburg: if either the Swabian or the Brandenburg line of Hohenzollern were to die out, then the other line would inherit their territories.

In 1702, Meinrad's uncle Francis Anthony died.  Both his sons had joined the clergy, so Hohenzollern-Haigerloch fell back to Hohenzollern-Sigmaringen.

In 1708, Meinrad founded a blast furnace works in Laucherthal (now part of Sigmaringendorf), which is now owned by Zollern GmbH, a company which is still partially owned by the descendants of the Princes of Hohenzollern.

Marriage and issue 
On 22 November 1700 in Sigmaringen, he married Johanna Katharina von Montfort, (1678–1759), a daughter of Count John Anthony I of Montfort-Tettnang.  They had the following children:
 Joseph Friedrich Ernst (1702–1769), his successor, married:
 in 1722 to Countess Marie of Oettingen-Spielberg (1703–1737)
 in 1738 to Countess Judith of Closen (1718–1743)
 in 1743 to Countess Maria Theresa of Waldburg-Trauchburg (1696–1761)
 Anna Maria (1707–1783)
 Franz Wilhelm (1704–1737), married in 1724 to Countess Marie Catharina of Waldburg-Zeil-Trauchburg (1702–1739)
 Charles Wolfgang (1708–1709)

Ancestry

See also 
 House of Hohenzollern

References 
 Gustav Schilling: Geschichte des Hauses Hohenzollern in genealogisch fortlaufenden Biographien aller seiner Regenten von den ältesten bis auf die neuesten Zeiten, nach Urkunden und andern authentischen Quellen. Fleischer, Leipzig, 1843, p. 279, Online
 Günter Schmitt: Sigmaringen, in: Günter Schmitt: Burgenführer Schwäbische Alb, vol. 3: Donautal. Wandern und entdecken zwischen Sigmaringen und Tuttlingen, Biberacher Verlagsdruckerei, Biberach, 1990, p. 41-62

External links 
 

Princes of Hohenzollern-Sigmaringen
House of Hohenzollern
1673 births
1715 deaths
17th-century German people
18th-century German people